Paris Saint-Germain Féminine have had eight presidents. Three of them have won at least one title. Qatari businessman and Qatar Sports Investments chairman, Nasser Al-Khelaifi, is the current president. He is also the club's first foreign president ever. Al-Khelaifi has been in charge since September 2012.

Formed in 1971, the women's team initially had amateur status and were run by the Association Paris Saint-Germain. This organisation, founded in 1970, managed the club's amateur and professional activities for two decades. It all changed when PSG were bought by Canal+ in May 1991 before the 1991–92 season. They created the Société Anonyme Sportive Professionnelle Paris Saint-Germain Football Club.

The Association and the club (SASP, i.e., professional sport limited company) were now two separate entities, each one with a different president. So, they reached an agreement in which the Association transferred the professional section to the SASP, while keeping control over the management of the amateur section. Between 1970 and 2012, the club's professional section only consisted of the men's team. When the female side turned professional in September 2012 ahead of the 2012–13 season, it detached from the Association and integrated the SASP. As with the male outfit, Nasser Al-Khelaifi became the new president.

Association PSG chairman Guy Crescent, elected in 1971, was the club's first president. For his part, Francis Borelli is the club's longest-serving president. He was at the helm for 13 years. Simon Tahar was the last to preside both the Association and PSG's female side. Nasser Al-Khelaifi became the first president of the club after its professionalisation in 2012.

PSG won its maiden honour, the Division 2 title, under Bernard Brochand in 2001. Simon Tahar was in office when the club claimed its first major trophy, the Coupe de France, in 2010. Nasser Al-Khelaifi is the club's most successful president in terms of trophies won, with three. Since he took over, the Parisians have claimed two French Cup titles (2018 and 2022) and one Division 1 championship (2021).

Presidents

As of September 2012.

Honours

As of the 2021–22 Coupe de France Final.

References

External links

Official websites
PSG.FR - Site officiel du Paris Saint-Germain
Paris Saint-Germain (Women) - UEFA.com

Presidents